The Nord Aviation CT20 was a French turbojet-powered radio-controlled target drone introduced in 1957. It has been noted for its similarity to the Ryan Firebee. The unmanned drone was used in the development of air-to-air missiles following the Second World War.

After the startup of the turbojet, the target drone is placed on a ramp and launched using two rockets. During its flight, the drone is controlled via radio signals from the ground. As it is made of light material, it is buoyant in water and can be recovered if it is forced to land on water.

Variants

Arsenal T.5.510 / S.F.E.C.M.A.S. T.5.510
 Original design work and development of the CT.20 carried out before SFECMAS was absorbed by SNCAN.
CT20
Radio controlled target
R20
Battlefield reconnaissance drone. 62 built for French Army.
Saab Rb 08
Anti-ship missile (AShM) version of CT20 for Royal Swedish Navy. 68 built.

Specifications (CT.20)

See also 
 KS-1 Komet
 KSShch
 P-15 Termit, P-5/35/45/6 Pyatyorka Redut Sepal URSS

References

CT20
Target drones of France
Single-engined jet aircraft
Mid-wing aircraft
V-tail aircraft